Eremanthus Less is a genus of plants belonging to the sunflower family.  All plants are native of the Cerrado region in Brazil.

Eremanthus species are eaten by the larvae of some Lepidoptera species including Dalcera abrasa which has been recorded on E. glomerulatus.

 Species

References

External links
 Sakamoto, H. T., et al. (2005) Quantitative HPLC analysis of sesquiterpene lactones and determination of chemotypes in Eremanthus seidelii MacLeish & Schumacher (Asteraceae). J. Braz. Chem. Soc. 16(6b) 1396-1401 accessed 27 March 2006

Asteraceae genera
Vernonieae
Endemic flora of Brazil